was a Japanese professional sumo wrestler from Nagasaki Prefecture. He was the sport's 50th yokozuna. After his retirement he was the head coach of Dewanoumi stable and served as head of the Japan Sumo Association.

Career
Born in Arikawa, Minamimatsuura District, he made his professional debut in January 1956, and reached sekitori status four years later upon promotion to the jūryō division in March 1960. He made his top makuuchi division debut in January 1961. Sadanoyama won his first tournament title in only his third tournament in the top division, from the rank of maegashira 13. The achievement of winning a tournament from the maegashira ranks is sometimes seen as a jinx on subsequent success in sumo, but Sadanoyama disproved that theory by going on to reach ōzeki in March 1962 after winning his second title, and then yokozuna in January 1965 after capturing his third championship.

 
He made a cameo appearance in the 1967 James Bond film You Only Live Twice, as himself. Although more attention was focused on yokozuna Taihō and Kashiwado, with their rivalry referred to as the Hakuho era after a combination of their shikona, Sadanoyama in fact ended up winning more tournament championships than Kashiwado.

Sadanoyama announced his retirement suddenly in March 1968, despite having won the previous two tournaments, two days after a surprise loss to a new maegashira, the Hawaiian born Takamiyama. It has been suggested that the shock of losing to a foreigner may have prompted a premature retirement. There is, however, no evidence for this and it is more likely he was continuing the tradition of wrestlers retiring at the peak of their power.

Retirement from sumo

Head of the Dewanoumi stable

Sadanoyama remained in the sumo world after his retirement, as an elder. Being the son-in-law of Dewanoumi's stable head coach, former maegashira Dewanohana Kuniichi, he inherited Dewanoumi stable. This succession was at the origin of the creation of the Kokonoe stable after Chiyonoyama exclusion from Dewanoumi's ichimon, the latter also wishing to inherit Dewanoumi's kabu.

As head coach of one of the most powerful heya in sumo, he helped produce a string of top division wrestlers, including yokozuna Mienoumi, sekiwake Dewanohana Yoshitaka and Washūyama, komusubi Ōnishiki, Ryōgoku, Oginishiki and fan's favorite Mainoumi.

Japan sumo association chairmanship

In February 1992 he became head of the Japan Sumo Association. He was chosen ahead of his contemporaries Taihō and Kashiwado partly because he was in better health than either of them. As chairman of the association he introduced a certain number of reforms such as the restrictions on foreign wrestlers (in 1992), limited at the time to 40 actives rikishi in total, up to 2 people per heya. In 1995, he also abrogated the tour system, changed from a promotional performance to an association independent performance.

He changed his toshiyori name to Sakaigawa in 1996, handing over the Dewanoumi name and the day-to-day running of his stable to the former Washūyama. The same year he tried to pass a new reform allowing the association to be the sole administrator of kabu to face the rising speculation around the possession of titles. At the time, the titles were either transmitted within a family or bought from the previous owner, the reform aimed to make the kabu the exclusive possession of the association the latter now giving the titles to the people requesting them. The proposition was however met with a refusal from the board of the association.

He did not run for re-election in 1998, after it became clear he lacked enough support due to his failed reform. He was then succeeded by former ōzeki Yutakayama from the rival Tokitsukaze faction. Remaining on the board, he subsequently became head of the judging department, an unusual move for a former head of the Sumo Association. Sadanoyama declined his right of doing a Kanreki dohyō-iri after receiving his red tsuna, in the form of taking responsibility for the turmoil during his time as a chairman.
He stood down as an elder in 2003 upon reaching the mandatory retirement age of sixty five and gave the kabu of Sakaigawa to his former trainee Ryōgoku.

Death
He died in a Tokyo hospital of pneumonia on April 27, 2017, at the age of 79. At the time of his death he was the oldest yokozuna since the passing of Wakanohana in 2010. Following his will, the funerals were held in a strict family circle.

Fighting style
Sadanoyama was known for employing pushing and thrusting techniques such as tsuppari (a series of rapid thrusts to the chest) and regularly won by such kimarite as  oshi dashi (push out) and tsuki dashi (thrust out). However he was also good on the mawashi where he preferred a migi-yotsu (left hand outside, right hand inside) grip, and often won by yori kiri (force out) and uwatenage (overarm throw).

Career record
The Kyushu tournament was first held in 1957, and the Nagoya tournament in 1958.

See also
Glossary of sumo terms
List of sumo tournament top division champions
List of sumo tournament top division runners-up
List of past sumo wrestlers
List of yokozuna

References

External links

 Japan Sumo Association profile

1938 births
2017 deaths
Japanese sumo wrestlers
Yokozuna
Sumo people from Nagasaki Prefecture
Deaths from pneumonia in Japan